Antwerp is the largest city in Belgium by area at  and the capital of Antwerp Province in the Flemish Region. With a population of 530,504, it is the most populous municipality in Belgium, and with a metropolitan population of around 1,200,000 people, it is the second-largest metropolitan region in Belgium, second only to Brussels.

Antwerp is on the river Scheldt, linked to the North Sea by the river's Westerschelde estuary. The Port of Antwerp is one of the biggest in the world, ranking second in Europe and within the top 20 globally. The city is also known as the hub of the world's diamond trade. In 2020, the Globalization and World Cities Research Network rated Antwerp as a Gamma + (third level/top tier) Global City.

Both economically and culturally, Antwerp is and has long been an important city in the Low Countries, especially before and during the Spanish Fury (1576) and throughout and after the subsequent Dutch Revolt. The Bourse of Antwerp, originally built in 1531 and re-built in 1872, was the world's first purpose-built commodity exchange. In 1920, the city hosted the Summer Olympics.

The inhabitants of Antwerp are nicknamed Sinjoren, after the Spanish honorific señor or French seigneur, "lord", referring to the Spanish noblemen who ruled the city in the 17th century. The city's population is very diverse, including about 180 nationalities; as of 2019, more than 50% of its population had a parent that was not a Belgian citizen at birth. A notable community is the Jewish one, as Antwerp is one of the only two cities in Europe (together with London and its Stamford Hill neighbourhood) that is home to a considerable Haredi population in the 21st century.

Toponymy

Etymology

Early recorded versions of the name include Ando Verpia on Roman coins found in the city centre, Germanic Andhunerbo from around the time Austrasia became a separate kingdom (that is, about 567 CE), and (possibly originally Celtic) Andoverpis in Dado's Life of St. Eligius (Vita Eligii) from about 700 CE. The form Antverpia is New Latin.

A Germanic (Frankish or Frisian) origin could contain prefix anda ("against") and a noun derived from the verb werpen ("to throw") and denote, for example: land thrown up at the riverbank; an alluvial deposit; a mound (like a terp) thrown up (as a defence) against (something or someone); or a wharf. If Andoverpis is Celtic in origin, it could mean "those who live on both banks".

There is a folklore tradition that the name Antwerpen is from Dutch handwerpen ("hand-throwing"). A giant called Antigoon is said to have lived near the Scheldt river and extracted a toll from passing boatmen. He severed the hand of anyone who did not pay, and threw it in the river. Eventually the giant was killed by a young hero named Silvius Brabo, who cut off the giant's own hand and flung that into the river. This is unlikely to be the true origin, but it is celebrated by a statue (illustrated further below) in the city's main market square, the Grote Markt.

History

Pre-1500
Historical Antwerp allegedly had its origins in a Gallo-Roman vicus. Excavations carried out in the oldest section near the Scheldt, 1952–1961 (ref. Princeton), produced pottery shards and fragments of glass from mid-2nd century to the end of the 3rd century. In the 4th century, Antwerp was first named, having been settled by the Germanic Franks.

The Merovingian Antwerp was evangelized by Saint Amand in the 7th century. Het Steen Castle has its origins in the Carolingian period in the 9th century. The castle may have been built after the Viking incursions in the early Middle Ages; in 879 the Normans invaded Flanders. The surviving structure was built between 1200 and 1225 as a gateway to a larger castle of the Dukes of Brabant which was demolished in the 19th century. It is Antwerp's oldest building. At the end of the 10th century, the Scheldt became the boundary of the Holy Roman Empire. Antwerp became a margraviate in 980, by the German emperor Otto II, a border province facing the County of Flanders.

In the 11th century, the best-known leader of the First Crusade (1096–1099), Godfrey of Bouillon, was originally Margrave of Antwerp, from 1076 until his death in 1100, though he was later also Duke of Lower Lorraine (1087–1100) and Defender of the Holy Sepulchre (1099–1100). In the 12th century, Norbert of Xanten established a community of his Premonstratensian canons at St. Michael's Abbey at Caloes. Antwerp was also the headquarters of Edward III during his early negotiations with Jacob van Artevelde, and his son Lionel, the Duke of Clarence, was born there in 1338.

16th century
After the silting-up of the Zwin and the consequent decline of Bruges, Antwerp, then part of the Duchy of Brabant, grew in importance, with the city doubling its population between 1500 and 1569. At the end of the 15th century the foreign trading houses were transferred from Bruges to Antwerp, and the building assigned to the association of English merchants active in the city is specifically mentioned in 1510. During this time, the old Mediterranean trade routes were gradually losing importance and the discovery of new sea routes via Africa to Asia and via the Atlantic to America helped push Antwerp to a position of prominence.

By 1504, the Portuguese had established Antwerp as one of their main shipping bases, bringing in spices from Asia and trading them for textiles and metal goods. The city's trade expanded to include cloth from England, Italy and Germany, wines from Germany, France and Spain, salt from France, and wheat from the Baltic. The city's skilled workers processed soap, fish, sugar, and especially cloth. Banks helped finance the trade, the merchants, and the manufacturers. The city was a cosmopolitan center; its bourse opened in 1531, "To the merchants of all nations."

Antwerp became the sugar capital of Europe, importing the raw commodity from Portuguese and Spanish plantations on both sides of the Atlantic, where it was grown by a mixture of free and forced labour, increasingly with enslaved Africans as the century progressed. The city attracted Italian and German sugar refiners by 1550, and shipped their refined product to Germany, especially Cologne. Antwerp also had an unusually high number of painters, around 360 in 1560, in a city with a population of roughly 89,000 in 1569 (250 people per painter), it was known as the best city for painters north of the Alps, serving notable painters such as Pieter Bruegel. Moneylenders and financiers developed a large business lending money all over Europe including the English government in 1544–1574. London bankers were too small to operate on that scale, and Antwerp had a highly efficient bourse that itself attracted rich bankers from around Europe. After the 1570s, the city's banking business declined: England ceased its borrowing in Antwerp in 1574.

Fernand Braudel states that Antwerp became "the centre of the entire international economy, something Bruges had never been even at its height." Antwerp had the highest growth rate and was the richest city in Europe at the time. Antwerp's Golden Age is tightly linked to the "Age of Exploration". During the first half of the 16th century Antwerp grew to become the second-largest European city north of the Alps. Many foreign merchants were resident in the city. Francesco Guicciardini, the Florentine envoy, stated that hundreds of ships would pass in a day, and 2,000 carts entered the city each week. Portuguese ships laden with pepper and cinnamon would unload their cargo. According to Luc-Normand Tellier "It is estimated that the port of Antwerp was earning the Spanish crown seven times more revenues than the Spanish colonization of the Americas".

Without a long-distance merchant fleet, and governed by an oligarchy of banker-aristocrats forbidden to engage in trade, the economy of Antwerp was foreign-controlled, which made the city very cosmopolitan, with merchants and traders from Venice, Genoa, Ragusa, Spain and Portugal. Antwerp had a policy of toleration, which attracted a large crypto-Jewish community composed of migrants from Spain and Portugal.

Antwerp experienced three booms during its golden age: the first based on the pepper market, a second launched by American silver coming from Seville (ending with the bankruptcy of Spain in 1557), and a third boom, after the stabilising Treaty of Cateau-Cambresis in 1559, based on the textiles industry. At the beginning of the 16th century Antwerp accounted for 40% of world trade. The boom-and-bust cycles and inflationary cost-of-living squeezed less-skilled workers. In the century after 1541, the city's economy and population declined dramatically The Portuguese merchants left in 1549, and there was much less trade in English cloth. Numerous financial bankruptcies began around 1557. Amsterdam replaced Antwerp as the major trading center for the region.

Reformation era
The religious revolution of the Reformation erupted in violent riots in August 1566, as in other parts of the Low Countries. The regent Margaret, Duchess of Parma, was swept aside when Philip II sent the Duke of Alba at the head of an army the following summer. When the Dutch revolt against Spain broke out in 1568, commercial trading between Antwerp and the Spanish port of Bilbao collapsed and became impossible. On 4 November 1576, Spanish soldiers sacked the city during the so-called Spanish Fury: 7,000 citizens were massacred, 800 houses were burnt down, and over £2 million sterling of damage was done.

Dutch revolt

Subsequently, the city joined the Union of Utrecht in 1579 and became the capital of the Dutch Revolt. In 1585, Alessandro Farnese, Duke of Parma and Piacenza, captured it after a long siege and as part of the terms of surrender its Protestant citizens were given two years to settle their affairs before quitting the city. Most went to the United Provinces in the north, starting the Dutch Golden Age. Antwerp's banking was controlled for a generation by Genoa, and Amsterdam became the new trading centre.

17th–19th centuries

The recognition of the independence of the United Provinces by the Treaty of Münster in 1648 stipulated that the Scheldt should be closed to navigation, which destroyed Antwerp's trading activities. This impediment remained in force until 1863, although the provisions were relaxed during French rule from 1795 to 1814, and also during the time Belgium formed part of the Kingdom of the United Netherlands (1815 to 1830). Antwerp had reached the lowest point in its fortunes in 1800, and its population had sunk to under 40,000, when Napoleon, realizing its strategic importance, assigned funds to enlarge the harbour by constructing a new dock (still named the Bonaparte Dock), an access-lock and mole, and deepening the Scheldt to allow larger ships to approach Antwerp. Napoleon hoped that by making Antwerp's harbour the finest in Europe he would be able to counter the Port of London and hamper British growth. However, he was defeated at the Battle of Waterloo before he could see the plan through.
In 1830, the city was captured by the Belgian insurgents, but the citadel continued to be held by a Dutch garrison under General David Hendrik Chassé. For a time Chassé subjected the town to periodic bombardment which inflicted much damage, and at the end of 1832 the citadel itself was besieged by the French Northern Army commanded by Marechal Gerard. During this attack the town was further damaged. In December 1832, after a gallant defence, Chassé made an honourable surrender, ending the Siege of Antwerp (1832).

And in 1894 Antwerp presented itself to the world via a World's Fair attended by 3 million.

20th century

Antwerp was the first city to host the World Gymnastics Championships, in 1903. During World War I, the city became the fallback point of the Belgian Army after the defeat at Liège. The Siege of Antwerp lasted for 11 days, but the city was taken after heavy fighting by the German Army, and the Belgians were forced to retreat westwards. Antwerp remained under German occupation until the Armistice.

Antwerp hosted the 1920 Summer Olympics.

During World War II, the city was an important strategic target because of its port. It was occupied by Germany on May 18, 1940 and liberated by the British 11th Armoured Division on September 4, 1944. After this, the Germans attempted to destroy the Port of Antwerp, which was used by the Allies to bring new material ashore. Thousands of Rheinbote, V-1 and V-2 missiles were fired (more V-2s than used on all other targets during the entire war combined), causing severe damage to the city but failed to destroy the port due to poor accuracy. After the war, Antwerp, which had already had a sizeable Jewish population before the war, once again became a major European centre of Haredi (and particularly Hasidic) Orthodox Judaism.

A Ten-Year Plan for the port of Antwerp (1956–1965) expanded and modernized the port's infrastructure with national funding to build a set of canal docks. The broader aim was to facilitate the growth of the north-eastern Antwerp metropolitan region, which attracted new industry based on a flexible and strategic implementation of the project as a co-production between various authorities and private parties. The plan succeeded in extending the linear layout along the Scheldt river by connecting new satellite communities to the main strip.

Starting in the 1990s, Antwerp rebranded itself as a world-class fashion centre. Emphasizing the avant-garde, it tried to compete with London, Milan, New York and Paris. It emerged from organized tourism and mega-cultural events.

Districts
The municipality comprises the city of Antwerp proper and several towns. It is divided into nine entities (districts):                                        
  Antwerp
 Berchem
 Berendrecht-Zandvliet-Lillo
 Borgerhout
 Deurne
 Ekeren
 Hoboken
 Merksem
 Wilrijk

In 1958, in preparation of the 10-year development plan for the Port of Antwerp, the municipalities of Berendrecht-Zandvliet-Lillo were integrated into the city territory and lost their administrative independence. During the 1983 merger of municipalities, conducted by the Belgian government as an administrative simplification, the municipalities of Berchem, Borgerhout, Deurne, Ekeren, Hoboken, Merksem and Wilrijk were merged into the city. At that time the city was also divided into the districts mentioned above. Simultaneously, districts received an appointed district council; later district councils became elected bodies.

Cityscape & architecture
Antwerp has a rich cultural and architectural heritage. In the 16th century already, the city was noted for the wealth of its citizens. The houses of these wealthy merchants and manufacturers have been preserved throughout the city. However, fire has destroyed several old buildings, such as the house of the Hanseatic League on the northern quays, in 1891. During World War II, the city also suffered considerable damage from V-bombs.

The Cathedral of Our Lady is the tallest cathedral in the Low Countries and remains the tallest building in the city. Construction of the church began in the 14th century and finished in 1518. It is home to several triptychs by the Baroque painter Rubens, viz. The Descent from the Cross, The Elevation of the Cross, The Resurrection of Christ and The Assumption. St. James' Church is more ornate than the cathedral. It contains the remains of numerous famous nobles, among them a major part of the family of Rubens. The present building is the work of the Waghemakere family and Rombout Keldermans, in Brabantine Gothic style. St. Charles Borromeo Church is located on the Hendrik Conscience square. It was built in 1615–1621 as the Jesuit church of Antwerp. The Hendrik Conscience Heritage Library is the city's storage library. It is named after the Flemish folk writer Hendrik Conscience, whose statue adorns the library. St. Boniface Church is an Anglican church and headseat of the arch-deanery North-West Europe. The St. Paul's Church has a Baroque interior. It is a few hundred yards north of the Grote Markt.

Other noteworthy sites throughout the city include Antwerp City Hall, which dates from 1565, and is built primarily in Renaissance style. Antwerpen-Centraal railway station is the city's main railway station. Designed by Louis Delacenserie, it was completed in 1905. Eclectically built in a combination of neo-Renaissance and Art Nouveau, it is considered to be one of the most beautiful train stations in the world. The Bourse of Antwerp was originally built 1531, extensively restored in 1872, and now known as the Antwerp Trade Fair. The  is the former town hall of Borgerhout, located on the Moorkensplein. Bourla Theatre is a theatre designed in 1827 in a neoclassical style by the city architect Pierre Bourla. Zurenborg is a late-19th-century Belle Époque neighbourhood, on the border of Antwerp and Berchem, with many Art Nouveau architectural elements. The area counts as one of the most original Belle Époque urban expansion areas in Europe. Boerentoren (Farmers' Tower) or KBC Tower, a 26-storey building built in 1932, is the oldest skyscraper in Europe. It is the tallest building in Antwerp and the second tallest structure after the Cathedral of our Lady. The building was designed by Emiel van Averbeke, R. Van Hoenacker and Jos Smolderen in Art Deco style. The Sint Anna tunnel  is a pedestrian and bicycle tunnel under the river Scheldt. Its construction started in 1931 and it was opened in 1933. Many authentic parts of the tunnel are still preserved, including the wooden escalators, old warning signs and the two entrance halls.

The MAS Museum is a 60-metre-high (200 ft) building designed by Neutelings Riedijk Architects. The façade is made of Indian red sandstone and curved glass panel construction. It is an example of postmodern Art Deco architecture. The Royal Museum of Fine Arts is a neoclassical building housing a collection of paintings, sculptures and drawings from the 14th to the 20th centuries. It is one of the primary landmarks of the Zuid district of Antwerp. The Butchers' Hall is a Gothic brick-built building, situated a short distance to the north-west of the Grote Markt. The Palace of Justice, designed by the Richard Rogers Partnership, Arup and VK Studio, was opened by King Albert II in April 2006. The courtrooms sit on top of six fingers that radiate from an airy central hall, and are surmounted by spires, which provide north light and resemble oast houses or the sails of barges on the nearby Scheldt. De Singel is an arts center located on the Desguinlei. It was designed by architect Léon Stynen who also designed the BP Building. The Port Authority Building, or the Port House, is a government building located in the area of Eilandje, in the Port of Antwerp, and acts as the new headquarters of the Antwerp Port Authority. It was designed by Iraqi-British architect Zaha Hadid.

Parks & recreational areas
Antwerp has many parks, open spaces and squares throughout the city. Stadspark is a 14-hectare park in the center of the city. It has the shape of a triangle with the base pointing south and the top pointing north. The park is bordered by the Quinten Matsijslei in the east, the Van Eycklei in the south and the Rubenslei in the west. Rivierenhof is a provincial domain in district of Deurne, owned and managed by the Province of Antwerp. It covers an area of 132 ha, making it the largest park in the city. Boekenbergpark is a park (10 ha) located in Deurne-Zuid. The swimming pond in Boekenbergpark was the first ecological swimming pond in Belgium and also the largest in Europe. Nachtegalenpark is a complex of several adjacent parks south of Antwerp. The area is 90 hectares in total. The parks were all built around a castle and were acquired by the municipality of Antwerp in 1910. The parks consist of Den Brandt (21 ha), Middelheim Park (24 ha) and Vogelenzang (40 ha). Park Spoor Noord is a landscape park located in the Dam-Schijnpoort, Antwerp district, which was built on the grounds of the former marshalling yard "Antwerp Dam" of the National Railway Company of Belgium (NMBS/SNCB). The Botanic Garden of Antwerp, which also carries the name Den Botaniek (also sometimes locally called Den Botanieken Hof or Kruidtuin), is a landscaped botanical garden created in 1825 in the inner city of Antwerp located at the Leopoldstraat. Te Boelaerpark is one of Antwerp's city parks and covers 16 hectares. It is located in the Borgerhout district between the Gitschotellei and the Arthur Matthyslaan. The Hobokense Polder is a nature reserve located in Hoboken. It is 170 hectares in size. It is located in northern Hoboken. It has been a nature reserve since 1995. On December 23, 1998, it officially became a nature reserve. The Hobokense Polder is located between the Scheldt, Hoboken and the Blue Gate business park. Kielpark is located in the Kiel neighbourhood, south of the Antwerp-Centrum interchange and west of the park is St. Catherine's Church.

Antwerp Zoo is the oldest zoo in Belgium and one of the oldest zoos in the world; it was opened on July 21, 1843. The zoo is located right next to Antwerp Central Station on the Koningin Astridplein. Antwerp Zoo has played its role in preservation and breeding programmes for several endangered species, including the okapi, the Przewalski horse, the Congo peafowl, the bonobo, the golden-headed lion tamarin, the European otter, and the Knysna seahorse. They take part in the European Endangered Species Programme. On January 1, 1983, the entire park (architecture and garden) was listed as a monument.

Fortifications

Although Antwerp was formerly a fortified city, hardly anything remains of the former enceinte, only some remains of the city wall can be seen near the Vleeshuis museum at the corner of Bloedberg and Burchtgracht. Steen castle on the Scheldt-quai is the gate wing of the demolished castle of the Dukes of Brabant. It was partly reconstructed in the 19th century.

Antwerp's development as a fortified city is documented between the 10th and the 20th century. The fortifications were developed in different phases:
 10th century: fortification of the wharf with a wall and a ditch
 12th and 13th century: canals (so called "vlieten" and "ruien") were made
 16th century: Spanish fortifications
 19th century: double ring of Brialmont forts around the city, dismantling of the Spanish fortifications
 20th century: 1960 dismantling of the inner ring of forts, decommissioning of the outer ring of forts

Demographics

Historical population

This is the population of the city of Antwerp only, not of the larger current municipality of the same name.

Ethnicity

In 2010, 36% to 39% of the inhabitants of Antwerp had foreign origins. A study projected that in 2020, 55% of the population would be of immigrant background, either first, second, or third generation.

Jewish community

After the Holocaust and the murder of its many Jews, Antwerp became a major centre for Orthodox Jews. At present, about 15,000 Haredi Jews, many of them Hasidic, live in Antwerp. The city has three official Jewish Congregations: Shomrei Hadass, headed by Rabbi Dovid Moishe Lieberman, Machsike Hadass, headed by Rabbi Aron Schiff (formerly by Chief Rabbi Chaim Kreiswirth) and the Portuguese Community Ben Moshe. Antwerp has an extensive network of synagogues, shops, schools and organizations. Significant Hasidic movements in Antwerp include Pshevorsk, based in Antwerp, as well as branches of Satmar, Belz, Bobov, Ger, Skver, Klausenburg, Vizhnitz and several others. Rabbi Chaim Kreiswirth, chief rabbi of the Machsike Hadas community, who died in 2001, was arguably one of the better known personalities to have been based in Antwerp. An attempt to have a street named after him has received the support of the Town Hall and is in the process of being implemented.

Jain community
The Jains in Belgium are estimated to be around about 1,500 people. The majority live in Antwerp, mostly involved in the very lucrative diamond business. Belgian Indian Jains control two-thirds of the rough diamonds trade and supplied India with roughly 36% of their rough diamonds. A major temple, with a cultural centre, has been built in Antwerp (Wilrijk). Mr Ramesh Mehta, a Jain, is a full-fledged member of the Belgian Council of Religious Leaders, put up on 17 December 2009.

Armenian community

There are significant Armenian communities that reside in Antwerp, many of whom are descendants of traders who settled during the 19th century. Most Armenian Belgians are adherents of the Armenian Apostolic Church, while a smaller number are adherents of the Armenian Catholic Church and Armenian Evangelical Church.

One of the important sectors that Armenian communities in Antwerp excel at and are involved in is the diamond trade business, that based primarily in the diamond district. Some of the famous Armenian families involved in the diamond business in the city are the Artinians, Arslanians, Aslanians, Barsamians and the Osganians.

Economy

Port
According to the American Association of Port Authorities, the port of Antwerp was the seventeenth largest (by tonnage) port in the world in 2005 and second only to Rotterdam in Europe. It handled 235.2 million tons of cargo in 2018. Importantly it handles high volumes of economically attractive general and project cargo, as well as bulk cargo. Antwerp's docklands, with five oil refineries, are home to a massive concentration of petrochemical industries, second only to the petrochemical cluster in Houston, Texas. Electricity generation is also an important activity, with four nuclear power plants at Doel, a conventional power station in Kallo, as well as several smaller combined cycle plants. There is a wind farm in the northern part of the port area. There are plans to extend this in the period 2014–2020.

Diamonds
Antwerp's other great mainstay is the diamond trade that takes place largely within the diamond district. 85 percent of the world's rough diamonds pass through the district annually, and in 2011 turnover in the industry was $56 billion. The city has four diamond bourses: the Diamond Club of Antwerp, the Beurs voor Diamanthandel, the Antwerpsche Diamantkring and the Vrije Diamanthandel. Antwerp's history in the diamond trade dates back to as early as the sixteenth century, with the first diamond cutters guild being introduced in 1584. The industry never disappeared from Antwerp, and even experienced a second boom in the early twentieth century. By the year 1924, Antwerp had over 13,000 diamond finishers. Since World War II families of the large Hasidic Jewish community have dominated Antwerp's diamond trading industry, although the last two decades have seen Indian and Maronite Christians from Lebanon and Armenian, traders become increasingly important.
Antwerp World Diamond Centre, (AWDC) the successor to the Hoge Raad voor Diamant, plays an important role in setting standards, regulating professional ethics, training and promoting the interests of Antwerp as the capital of the diamond industry. However, in recent years Antwerp has seen a downturn in the diamond business, with the industry shifting to cheaper labor markets such as Dubai or India.
The industry has avoided the 2022 European sanctions against Russia although the imports from Alrosa have diminished.
If banned, the AWDC claims 10,000 jobs would be at risk.

Transportation

Rail
Antwerp is the focus of lines to the north to Essen and the Netherlands, east to Turnhout, south to Mechelen, Brussels and Charleroi, and southwest to Ghent and Ostend. It is served by international and Thalys trains to Amsterdam, Rotterdam and Paris, and national trains to Ghent, Bruges, Ostend, Brussels, Charleroi, Hasselt, Liège, Leuven and Turnhout.

Antwerp Central station is an architectural monument in itself, and is mentioned in W G Sebald's haunting novel Austerlitz. Prior to the completion in 2007 of a tunnel that runs northwards under the city centre to emerge at the old Antwerp Dam station, Central was a terminus. Trains from Brussels to the Netherlands had to either reverse at Central or call only at Berchem station,  to the south, and then describe a semicircle to the east, round the Singel. Now, they call at the new lower level of the station before continuing in the same direction.

Antwerp is also home to Antwerpen-Noord, the largest classification yard for freight in Belgium and second largest in Europe. The majority of freight trains in Belgium depart from or arrive here. It has two classification humps and over a hundred tracks.

Public transportation
The city has a web of tram and bus lines operated by De Lijn and providing access to the city centre, suburbs and the Left Bank. The tram network has 14 lines, of which the underground section is called the "premetro" and includes a tunnel under the river. The Franklin Rooseveltplaats functions as the city's main hub for local and regional bus lines.

Road
A six-lane motorway bypass encircles much of the city centre and runs through the urban residential area of Antwerp. Known locally as the "Ring" it offers motorway connections to Brussels, Hasselt and Liège, Ghent, Lille and Bruges and Breda and Bergen op Zoom (Netherlands). The banks of the Scheldt are linked by three road tunnels (in order of construction): the Waasland Tunnel (1934), the Kennedy Tunnel (1967) and the Liefkenshoek Tunnel (1991).

Daily congestion on the Ring led to a fourth high-volume highway link called the "Oosterweelconnection" being proposed. It would have entailed the construction of a long viaduct and bridge (the Lange Wapper) over the docks on the north side of the city in combination with the widening of the existing motorway into a 14-lane motorway; these plans were eventually rejected in a 2009 public referendum. 

In September 2010 the Flemish Government decided to replace the bridge by a series of tunnels. There are ideas to cover the Ring in a similar way as happened around Paris, Hamburg, Madrid and other cities. This would reconnect the city with its suburbs and would provide development opportunities to accommodate part of the foreseen population growth in Antwerp which currently are not possible because of the pollution and noise generated by the traffic on the Ring. An old plan to build an R2 outer ring road outside the built up urban area around the Antwerp agglomeration for port related traffic and transit traffic never materialized.

Air

A small airport, Antwerp International Airport, is located in the district of Deurne. The airport is mainly used as a business airport. Flying Group, the largest business jet company in the Benelux and France, has its headquarters there and several maintenance sheds and hangars for their private jets. There are also some regular scheduled flights by TUI fly with direct connectivity to Spain, United Kingdom, Germany, Croatia, Italy, Austria and Morocco. Luxair will fly again to London City airport from 2023. A bus service connects the airport to the city centre. The runway has increased in length, and there is now direct connectivity to Spain, United Kingdom, Germany, France, Italy, and Greece from the city of Antwerp.

It is connected to the city centre by bus, and also by train. The new Diabolo rail connection provides a direct fast train connection between Antwerp and Brussels Airport as of the summer of 2012.

There is also a direct rail service between Antwerp (calling at Central and Berchem stations) and Charleroi South station, with a connecting buslink to Brussels South Charleroi Airport, which runs twice every hour on working days.

Politics

City council
The current city council was elected in the October 2018 elections.

The current majority consists of N-VA, sp.a and Open Vld, led by mayor Bart De Wever (N-VA).

Former mayors

In the 16th and 17th century important mayors include Philips of Marnix, Lord of Saint-Aldegonde, Anthony van Stralen, Lord of Merksem and Nicolaas II Rockox.
In the early years after Belgian independence, Antwerp was governed by Catholic-Unionist mayors. Between 1848 and 1921, all mayors were from the Liberal Party (except for the so-called Meeting-intermezzo between 1863 and 1872). Between 1921 and 1932, the city had a Catholic mayor again: Frans Van Cauwelaert.
From 1932 onwards and up until 2013, all mayors belonged to the Social Democrat party: Camille Huysmans, Lode Craeybeckx, Frans Detiège and Mathilde Schroyens, and after the municipality fusion: , Leona Detiège en Patrick Janssens. Since 2013, the mayor is the Flemish nationalist Bart De Wever, belonging to the Flemish separatist party N-VA (New Flemish Alliance).

Culture
Antwerp had an artistic reputation in the 17th century, based on its school of painting, which included Rubens, Van Dyck, Jordaens, the Teniers and many others.

Museums
 Royal Museum of Fine Arts. The neoclassical building housing a collection of paintings, sculptures and drawings from the 14th to the 20th centuries. It is one of the primary landmarks of the Zuid district of Antwerp. The majestic building was designed by Jean-Jacques Winders and Frans Van Dijk, built beginning in 1884, opened in 1890, and completed in 1894.
 Rubenshuis, is the former home and studio of Rubens in Antwerp. It is now a museum.
 Plantin-Moretus Museum preserves the house of the printer Christoffel Plantijn and his successor Jan Moretus. It has been a UNESCO World Heritage Site since 2005.
 Museum Mayer van den Bergh, with works from the Gothic and Renaissance period in the Netherlands and Belgium, including paintings by Pieter Brueghel the Elder.
 Museum of Contemporary Art (M HKA). The museum holds a permanent collection of contemporary art from Belgian and international artists, an arthouse cinema and an extensive library of books on contemporary art.
 Museum aan de Stroom, whose central focus is Antwerp and its connection to the world.
 Fotomuseum Antwerp, also known as FOMU, is a museum of photography
 MoMu ModeMuseum is a fashion museum. Founded on 21 September 2002, the museum collects, conserves, studies and exhibits Belgian fashion.
 Red Star Line Museum, is a museum about the history of the Red Star Line, which opened on September 28, 2013.

Music and festivals

Antwerp is the home of the Antwerp Jazz Club (AJC), founded in 1938 and located on the square Grote Markt since 1994. Antwerp also has various concert halls, such as the Stadsschouwburg, the Bourlaschouwburg, the Flemish Opera, the Arenbergschouwburg and the Koningin Elisabethzaal. Large (pop) performances are often held in the Sportpaleis or in the Lotto Arena. These event halls are located in Merksem. In addition, there are other well-known venues like De Roma and Trix, both of which are located in Borgerhout.

The band dEUS was formed in 1991 in Antwerp. dEUS began their career as a covers band, but soon began writing their own material. Their musical influences range from folk and punk to jazz and progressive rock. black wave. (also known as blackwavedot) is an Antwerp hip-hop duo composed of producer Willem Ardui and rapper Jay Walker. Their influences include The Roots, Prince, Parliament-Funkadelic and Brockhampton.  Confetti's were a new beat band at the end of the 80's. Their name stems from the name of a nightclub in the Antwerps affluent suburb of Brasschaat. Their 1st video for 'The Sound of C' was shot on the main Antwerp shopping street. Pump Up the Jam the eurobeat/dance song that reached top positions in charts worldwide in 1989 was produced in Antwerp. Belgian-Congolese singer Ya Kid K had Antwerp as her Belgian home base.

Some well known festivals around the city are: Linkerwoofer, a pop-rock music festival located at the left bank of the Scheldt. This music festival starts in August and mostly local Belgian musicians play and perform in this event. Jazz Middelheim is an annual summer jazz festival in the Middelheim Park. Tomorrowland is probably the most famous festival to arise from Antwerp. Though the festival is effectively located 15 km (10 mi) south of the city its founders in the past organised a festival ('Antwerp is burning') within city limits. The office of the company behind Tomorrowland (weareone.world bvba) is located in the heart of the city. The company founders are involved in conceptualising urban planning concepts for specific Antwerp areas and are known to invite their favourite Antwerp food places to set up a pop-up at the festival. Sfinks festival is a global pop festival that takes place annually in Boechout, a village southeast of Antwerp. The first edition dates from 1976. Other popular festivals are Fire Is Gold, Ampere Open Air and Vaag Outdoor focusing more on hip-hop music, house and techno.

Nightlife  
Antwerp has a vibrant and varied nightlife scene. There are many areas around the town with cafe's (bars) and nightclubs. There are plenty of cafe's to be found in the old center and around the Grote Markt. A very cozy atmosphere surrounded by the authentic buildings of the city. The Belgians like a beer and are one of the better known beer exporters for a reason. Other well known areas where you will find more locals include: het Mechelseplein, known for the various cafes that are located there: the Boer Van Tienen, Kapitein Zeppos, Korsakov, Hypotalamus and the Pallieter. Het Zuid (South) neighbourhood, with the many bars, restaurants and cafes, it is known as a hip area. The district owes its name to the Royal Museum of Fine Arts, the Museum of Contemporary Art Antwerp (M HKA) and the Photo Museum. The Dageraadplaats, the bustling heart of the belle-époque neighbourhood of Zurenborg.

Antwerp also has a variety of nightclubs. Some of the most famous and infamous ones include:  Ampère club, located beneath the central station and even though it's only been here for 2 years, it's already an institution in Belgian nightlife. Club Vaag, an underground basement nightclub located in walking distance from "Het Eilandje". Underneath the same roof as Club Vaag you will find Club Lima, a classy nightlife club with mostly RnB & vocal House music.  Previously known as NOXX Club, Ikon Antwerp, a premium event location where you will find all different styles of music, with international artists & DJ's around. Club Capital, an underground club located in the city park. The nightclub opened in 2004, but a fire erupted in 2010, taking the place down. Nine years later, the club was reopend.

Fashion  
Antwerp is a rising fashion city, and has produced designers such as the Antwerp Six. The city has a cult status in the fashion world, due to the Royal Academy of Fine Arts, one of the most important fashion academies in the world. It has served as the learning centre for many Belgian fashion designers. Since the 1980s, several graduates of the Belgian Royal Academy of Fine Arts have become internationally successful fashion designers in Antwerp. The city has had a huge influence on other Belgian fashion designers such as Raf Simons, Veronique Branquinho, Olivier Theyskens and Kris Van Assche. In 2019, Arte won the Fashion brand of the Year award at the Belgian Fashion Awards. The Antwerp label was founded by Bertony Da Silva in 2009

Local products
Antwerp is famous for its local products. In August every year the Bollekesfeest takes place. The Bollekesfeest is a showcase for such local products as Bolleke, an amber beer from the De Koninck Brewery. The city's historical ale, Seefbier, dating back to the 16th century and brewed at the Antwerpse Brouw Compagnie is a testament to the city's long brewing history and one of Belgium's oldest existing beerstyles. The Mokatine sweets made by Confiserie Roodthooft, Elixir D'Anvers, a locally made liquor, locally roasted coffee from Koffie Verheyen, sugar from Candico, Poolster pickled herring and Equinox horse meat, are other examples of local specialities. One of the most known products of the city are its biscuits, the Antwerpse Handjes, literally "Antwerp Hands". Usually made from a short pastry with almonds or milk chocolate, they symbolize the Antwerp trademark and folklore. The local products are represented by a non-profit organization, Streekproducten Provincie Antwerpen vzw.

Restaurants and cuisine 

Antwerp has grown into the culinary capital of Flanders and Belgium. It has no fewer than eleven restaurants with at least one MICHELIN star. Zilte by Viki Geunes located in the MAS museum even received the ultimate award of three stars.

World Choir Games
The city of Antwerp will co-host the 2020 World Choir Games together with the city of Ghent. Organised by the Interkultur Foundation, the World Choir Games is the biggest choral competition and festival in the world.

Missions to Seafarers
A number of Christian missions to seafarers are based in Antwerp. These include the Mission to Seafarers, British & International Sailors' Society, the Finnish Seamen's Mission, the Norwegian Sjømannskirken and the Apostleship of the Sea. They provide cultural and social activities as well as religious services. The iconic Italiëlei premises have been closed down and all activities have been moved to the Antwerp Harbour Hotel on Noorderlaan.

Sport

Events 
Antwerp held the 1920 Summer Olympics, which were the first games after the First World War and also the only ones to be held in Belgium. Antwerp hosted the 2013 World Artistic Gymnastics Championships and was designated by the International Gymnastics Federation as the host city for the World Artistic Gymnastics Championships in 2023. The event will take place from September 29 to October 8, 2023 in the Sportpaleis. Annually Antwerp hosts the European Open ATP Tour 250 tennis tournament that takes place in Antwerp's Sport Palace. It was introduced for the 2016 ATP World Tour. Another annually event is the Antwerp 10 miles and the Antwerp marathon.

For the year 2013, Antwerp was awarded the title of European Capital of Sport.

Football 
Antwerp is home of two professional football clubs being, Royal Antwerp F.C., currently playing in the Belgian First Division, founded in 1880 and is known as 'The Great Old' for being the first club registered to the Royal Belgian Football Association in 1895. Over the course of the club's history, Royal Antwerp have won four Belgian league titles as well as three Belgian Cups. Another club in the city is K Beerschot VA, founded in 1899 by former Royal Antwerp players. They play at the Olympisch Stadion, the main venue of the 1920 Olympics. Between these two football teams there has always been a big rivalry. When the two play against each other the stadiums are packed and the passioned fans give a great display of their passion, but this has also led to fights, hooliganism and vandalism.

Basketball 
The Antwerp Giants play in Basketball League Belgium, their home arena is the Lotto Arena. The club plays in the highest tier of Belgian basketball. Antwerp has won the Belgian championship once, in 2000. The team has also won four Belgian Cups, in 2000, 2007, 2019 and 2020.

The city's Groenplaats hosted the official 2022 FIBA 3x3 World Cup.

Education

Antwerp has a university and several colleges. The University of Antwerp (Universiteit Antwerpen) was established in 2003, following the merger of the RUCA, UFSIA and UIA institutes. Their roots go back to 1852. The university has approximately 23,000 registered students, making it the third-largest university in Flanders, as well as 1,800 foreign students. It has 7 faculties, spread over four campus locations in the city centre and in the south of the city. The university is part of Young Universities for the Future of Europe (YUFE) and Young European Research Universities Network (YERUN).

The city has several colleges, including Antwerp Management School (AMS), the Antwerp Maritime Academy, the Karel de Grote Hogeschool and AP Hogeschool Antwerpen. AP Hogeschool has about 15,000 students and 1,600 staff, and the Karel de Grote Hogeschool has about 13,500 students and 1,300 staff.

International relations

Twin towns and sister cities

The following places are twinned with or are sister cities to Antwerp:

  Fes, Morocco, 2000
  Rotterdam, the Netherlands, 1940
  Mulhouse, France, 1954
  Barcelona, Spain, 1997
  Rostock, Germany, 1963
  Shanghai, China, 1984
  Marseille, France, 1958
  Haifa, Israel, 1995
  Cape Town, South Africa, 1996
  Ludwigshafen, Germany, 1998

Partnerships

Notable people

Born in Antwerp

 Lionel of Antwerp, 1st Duke of Clarence, (1338–1368) son of Edward III of England .
 Samuel Blommaert, (1583–1654) Director of Dutch West India Company
 Frans Floris, (1520–1570) painter.
 Abraham Ortelius, (1527–98) cartographer and geographer.
 Gillis van Coninxloo, (1544–1607) painter of forest landscapes
 Bartholomeus Spranger, (1546–1611) painter, draughtsman and etcher
 Matthijs Bril, (1550–1583) landscape painter
 Martín Antonio del Río, (1551–1608) Jesuit theologian
 Balthazar de Moucheron, (–) a founder of the Dutch East India Company
 Paul Bril, (1554–1626) landscape painter.
 Willem Usselincx, (1567–1647) Flemish merchant and investor, one of the founders of the Dutch West India Company
 Abraham Janssens, (–1632) painter.
 Rodrigo Calderón, Count of Oliva, (–1621) Spanish favourite and adventurer.
 Frans Snyders, (1579–1657) still life and animal painter
 Osias Beert the Elder, (1580–1623) painter
 Frans Hals, (1580–1666) painter.
 Caspar de Crayer, (1582–1669) painter.
 David Teniers the Elder, (1582–1649) painter.
 Jacob Jordaens, (1593–1678) painter
 Anthony van Dyck, (1599–1641) painter.
 Cornelis Melyn, (1600-) early American settler, patron of Staten Island
 Pieter van Schaeyenborgh, (1600–1657) painter of fish still lifes
 David Teniers the Younger, (1610–1690) painter.
 Jan Fyt, (–1661) animal painter.
 Nicolaes Maes, (1634–1693) Baroque painter.
 Hendrik Abbé, (1639–?) engraver, painter and architect
 Gerard Edelinck, (1649–1707) copperplate engraver.
 Jacob Leyssens, (1661–1710) Baroque painter
 Peter Tillemans, (–1734) painter
 John Michael Rysbrack, (1694–1770) sculptor
 Joseph-Jean Le Grelle, (1764-1822) founder of the Joseph J. Le Grelle Bank in 1792
 Gérard Comte Le Grelle, (1793-1871) Mayor of Antwerp (1831-1848), and member of the National Congress
 Francis Palms, (1809–1886) Belgian-American landholder and businessman
 Hendrik Conscience, (1812–1883) writer and author of De Leeuw van Vlaanderen ("The Lion of Flanders").
 Johann Coaz, (1822–1918) Swiss forester, topographer and mountaineer
 Jef Lambeaux, (1852–1908) sculptor of the Brabo fountain on the Grote Markt.
 Georges Eekhoud, (1854–1927) novelist
 Hippolyte Delehaye, (1859–1941) Jesuit priest and hagiographic scholar.
 Ferdinand Perier, (1875–1968) Jesuit priest and 3rd archbishop of Calcutta
 Willem Elsschot, (1882–1960) writer and poet
 Maria Baers, (1883–1959) senator, feminist, and trade unionist.
 Jef van Hoof, (1886–1959) conductor and composer
 Constant Permeke, (1886–1952) expressionist painter
 Jacoba Hol (1886–1964), physical geographer
 Maria Scheepers (1892-1989) pianist and music educator
 Paul van Ostaijen, (1896–1928) poet and writer
 Alice Nahon, (1896–1933) poet
 Albert Lilar, (1900–1976) Minister of Justice
 Maurice Gilliams, (1900–1982) writer
 Michel Seuphor, (1901–1999) painter, designer
 André Cluytens, (1905–1967) conductor
 Daniel Sternefeld, (1905–1986) composer and conductor
 Maurice van Essche, (1906–1977) Belgian-born South African painter
 Antoinette Feuerwerker, (1912–2003) French jurist and member of the Resistance
 Jean Bingen, (1920–2012) Belgian papyrologist and epigrapher
 Karl Gotch, (1924–2007) professional wrestler
 Chris Mary-Francine Whittle, (born 1927), composer
 Simon Kornblit, (1933–2010) American advertising and film studio executive.
 Bernard de Walque, (born 1938) architect
 Ferre Grignard, (1939–1982) rock singer/songwriter, known for Ring Ring, I've Got to Sing
 Anthony Ruys, (born 1947) business executive
 Carl Verbraeken, (born 1950) composer
 Serge Strosberg, (born 1966) Belgian painter
 Tom Barman, (born 1972) Belgian musician and film director
 Matthias Schoenaerts, (born 1977) actor
 Tia Hellebaut, (born 1978) Olympic high jump champion
 Evi Goffin, (born 1981) vocalist
 Jessica Van Der Steen, (born 1984) model
 Toby Alderweireld, (born 1989) professional Belgian footballer
 Laetitia Beck, (born 1992) Israeli golfer
 Romelu Lukaku, (born 1993) professional Belgian footballer
 Retin Obasohan, (born 1993) basketball player for Hapoel Jerusalem
 Naomi Schiff, (born 1994) racing driver who competed in the W Series under a German licence

Lived in Antwerp

 Erasmus II Schetz, (died 1550) Lord of Grobbendonk
 Quentin Matsys, (1466–1530) Renaissance painter, founder of the Antwerp school.
 Jan Mabuse, (–1532) painter
 Joachim Patinir, (–1524) landscape and religious painter
 William Tyndale, (–1536) Bible translator, arrested in Antwerp and burnt at the stake.
 John Rogers, (–1555) Christian minister, Bible translator, commentator and martyr.
 Joos van Cleve, (–) painter
 Damião de Góis, (1502–1574) Portuguese humanist philosopher.
 Sir Thomas Gresham, (–1579) English merchant and financier.
 Antonis Mor, (1520–) portrait painter.
 Christophe Plantin, (–1589) humanist, book printer and publisher.
 Pieter Bruegel the Elder, (–) painter and printmaker.
 Philips of Marnix, Lord of Saint-Aldegonde, (1538–1598) writer and statesman.
 Simon Stevin, (–1620) mathematician and engineer.
 Federigo Giambelli, (–) Italian military and civil engineer.
 Nicolaas Rockox (1560–1640), mayor of Antwerp.
 John Bull, (–1628) English/Welsh composer, musician and organ builder.
 Jan Brueghel the Elder, (1568–1625) also known as "Velvet" Brueghel, painter.
 Peter Paul Rubens, (1577–1640) painter.
 William Cavendish, 1st Duke of Newcastle, (–1676) soldier, courtier and writer.
 Adriaen Brouwer, (1605–1638) painter
 Jan Davidsz. de Heem, (1606–1684) painter.
 Wenceslas Hollar, (1607–1677) Bohemian etcher.
 Jan Lievens, (1607–1674) painter
 Ferdinand van Apshoven the Younger, (–1694) painter
 Frédéric Théodore Faber, painter (1782–1799)
 Jan Frans Willems, (1793–1846) writer.
 Abraham Mayer, (1816–1899) German-born physician
 Ford Madox Brown, (1821–1893) a British painter, studied art at Antwerp.
 Henri Alexis Brialmont, (1821–1903) military engineer.
 George du Maurier, (1834–1896) cartoonist, author and grandfather of Daphne du Maurier
 Sir Lawrence Alma-Tadema, (1836–1912) painter.
 Robert Barrett Browning, (1849–1912) English painter, studied painting in Antwerp
 Vincent van Gogh, (1853–1890) impressionist Dutch painter, lived in Antwerp for four months.
 Camille Huysmans, (1871–1968) Socialist politician, former mayor of Antwerp and former Prime Minister of Belgium
 Moshe Yitzchok Gewirtzman, (1881–1976) Hasidic Pshevorsk movement leader in Antwerp
 Romi Goldmuntz, (1882–1960) diamond businessman
 August De Boodt, (1895–1986) politician
 Gerard Walschap, (1898–1989) writer
 Albert Lilar, (1900–1976) Minister of Justice
 Suzanne Lilar, (1901–1992) essayist, novelist, and playwright
 Chaim Kreiswirth, (1918–2001) Rabbi of the Machzikei Hadass Community, Antwerp
 Eric de Kuyper, (born 1942) award-winning novelist, filmmaker, semiotician
 Philip Sessarego, (1952–2008) former British Army soldier, conman, hoaxer, mercenary lived in Antwerp and found dead in a garage
 Veerle Casteleyn, (born 1978) musical theatre performer and ballerina, trained in Antwerp.
 Andy Van Vliet (born 1995), Belgian basketball player for Bnei Herzliya Basket in the Israeli Basketball Premier League

See also
 Antwerp Book Fair
 Antwerp lace
 Antwerp Water Works (AWW)
 Fortifications of Antwerp
 K Beerschot VA, local football club
 Letterenhuis
 List of mayors of Antwerp

Notes

References

Further reading

 Blanchard, Ian.  The International Economy in the "Age of the Discoveries," 1470–1570: Antwerp and the English Merchants' World (Stuttgart: Franz Steiner Verlag, 2009). 288 pp. in English
 Harreld, Donald J. "Trading Places," Journal of Urban History (2003) 29#6 pp 657–669
 Lindemann, Mary. The Merchant Republics: Amsterdam, Antwerp, and Hamburg, 1648–1790 (Cambridge University Press, 2014) 356 pp.
 Limberger, Michael. Sixteenth-Century Antwerp and its Rural Surroundings: Social and Economic Changes in the Hinterland of a Commercial Metropolis (ca. 1450–1570) (Turnhout: Brepols Publishers, 2008). 284 pp. .
 
 Stillwell, Richard, ed. Princeton Encyclopedia of Classical Sites, 1976:  "Antwerp Belgium"
 Van der Wee, Herman. The Growth of the Antwerp Market and the European Economy (14th–16th Centuries) (The Hague, 1963)

External links

 Official website
 Tourism Antwerp
 Visit Antwerp

 
Municipalities of Antwerp Province
Port cities and towns in Belgium
Port cities and towns of the North Sea
Provincial capitals of Flanders
Orthodox Jewish communities
Trading posts of the Hanseatic League
Olympic cycling venues
Venues of the 1920 Summer Olympics